Caccia Dominioni is a surname. Notable people with the surname include:

Camillo Caccia Dominioni (1877–1946), Italian cardinal
Carlo Caccia Dominioni (1802–1866), Italian prelate
Paolo Caccia Dominioni (1896-1992), Italian soldier
Luigi Caccia Dominioni (1913-2016), Italian architect and furniture designer